Scydmaenus is a genus of beetles belonging to the family Staphylinidae.

The genus has almost cosmopolitan distribution.

Species:
 Scydmaenus abnormis Franz, 1986 
 Scydmaenus abyssinicus (Reitter, 1880)

References

Staphylinidae
Staphylinidae genera